POLS may refer to:
Principle of least surprise
Political science